The Fuzileiros Navais (Portuguese for Naval Fusiliers) are the marines of Portugal and Brasil.  

Portuguese Marine Corps
Brazilian Marine Corps

Marines

pt:Fuzileiro Naval